Ana Salas Lozano (born 12 July 1972) is a Spanish former professional tennis player.

A right-handed player from Madrid, Salas reached a best singles ranking on tour of 275, with four ITF titles.

In 1998 she received a wildcard into the main draw of her home WTA Tour tournament, the Madrid Open, where she was beaten in the first round by Meike Babel.

ITF finals

Singles: 8 (4–4)

Doubles: 4 (0–4)

References

External links
 
 

1972 births
Living people
Spanish female tennis players
Tennis players from Madrid
20th-century Spanish women